Hope Aerodrome  is located  west of Hope Townsite (the previous Town of Hope) within the municipal District of Hope, British Columbia, Canada.

This airfield is home to the Vancouver Soaring Association, a gliding club owning and operating seven school and recreational sailplanes and two Cessna L-19 Bird Dog as tow planes.

There is one turf runway, . The airport is operated by the Fraser Valley Regional District. The Hope Airport lies within the community of Flood in the District of Hope.

History
The aerodrome was listed as "under construction - servicable" with one runway listed as follows:

Hope is notable as being the location of a Boeing demonstration of the Boeing 737's landing and take off abilities in 1972.

See also
 List of airports in the Lower Mainland

References

External links
Vancouver Soaring Association
Hope Airport Weather Cam at the Meteorological Service of Canada 
Hope Airpark on COPA's Places to Fly airport directory

Registered aerodromes in British Columbia
Lower Mainland
Royal Canadian Air Force stations
Military airbases in British Columbia
Military history of British Columbia